The Lesser Antillean pewee (Contopus latirostris) is a species of bird in the family Tyrannidae.

It is found in Dominica, Guadeloupe, Martinique, Puerto Rico, and Saint Lucia with records from Saint Kitts. Birds on Puerto Rico are sometimes considered to be a separate species (Puerto Rican pewee, C. portoricensis) as are those on Saint Lucia (Saint Lucia pewee, C. oberi).

Its natural habitats are subtropical or tropical dry forest, subtropical or tropical moist lowland forest, and subtropical or tropical moist montane forest.

See also 

 Fauna of Puerto Rico
 List of birds of Puerto Rico
 List of endemic fauna of Puerto Rico
 List of Puerto Rican birds
 List of Vieques birds
 El Toro Wilderness

References

Lesser Antillean pewee
Birds of Puerto Rico
Birds of the Lesser Antilles
Lesser Antillean pewee
Taxonomy articles created by Polbot